Louis Jacobs  (17 July 1920 – 1 July 2006) was a leading writer and theologian. He was the rabbi of the New London Synagogue in the United Kingdom.  He was also the focus in the early 1960s of what became known as "The Jacobs Affair" in the British Jewish community.

Early career
Jacobs was born on 17 July 1920 in Manchester. He studied at Manchester Yeshiva, and later at the kolel in Gateshead. His teachers included leading Rabbi Eliyahu Dessler. Jacobs was ordained as a rabbi at Manchester Yeshiva. Later in his career, he studied at University College London where he gained his PhD on the topic of The Business Life of the Jews in Babylon, 200–500 CE. Jacobs was appointed rabbi at Manchester Central Synagogue in 1948. In 1954 he was appointed to the New West End Synagogue in London.

Jacobs became Moral Tutor at Jews' College, London, where he taught Talmud and homiletics during the last years of Rabbi Dr Isidore Epstein's tenure as principal. By this time, Jacobs had drifted away from the strictly traditional approach to Jewish theology that had marked his formative years. Instead he struggled to find a synthesis that would accommodate Orthodox Jewish theology and modern day higher biblical criticism. Jacobs was especially concerned with how to reconcile modern day Orthodox Jewish faith with the Documentary Hypothesis. His ideas about the subject were outlined in the book, We Have Reason to Believe, which was published in 1957. The work was originally written to record the essence of discussions held on its title's subject at weekly classes given by Jacobs at the New West End Synagogue and resulted at the time in some mild criticism but not in any major censure.

We Have Reason to Believe
Most of Jacobs' book We Have Reason to Believe deals with such topics as proof of God's existence, pain, miracles, the after-life, and the idea of a "Chosen People", ideas which were not in themselves controversial. Debate on the book was eventually to centre on chapters 6, 7, and 8: The Torah and Modern Criticism, A Synthesis of the Traditional and Critical Views and Bible Difficulties.

In these chapters Jacobs took on discussion of "Modern Criticism" of the Bible, more specifically textual analysis of the Torah known as the "Documentary Hypothesis", which suggests that its texts derives from multiple sources, rather than having been given, as Orthodox rabbinical traditions have it, complete in its present form by God to Moses during the period beginning on Mount Sinai and ending with Moses's death.

Jacobs comments: "While Judaism stands or falls on the belief in revelation, there is no 'official' interpretation on the way in which God spoke to man". He writes that "according to some rabbis, [the Pentateuch] was given to Moses at intervals during the sojourn in the Wilderness". But he also comments that given the arguments of textual criticism "no work of Jewish apologetics, however limited in scope, can afford to fight shy of the problem". Here there is an implied rebuke of the tendency of many Jewish authorities of the period simply to gloss over the inconveniences of the thoughts of the "modern critics" – a rebuke which may have rankled with some.

Jacobs concludes: "there is nothing to deter the faithful Jew from accepting the principle of textual criticism". He is aware that "to talk about 'reconciling' the Maimonidean idea and the Documentary Hypothesis […] is futile, for you cannot reconcile two contradictory theories. But to say this is not to preclude the possibility of a synthesis between the old knowledge and the new knowledge".

Jacobs provides numerous examples from the Talmud and from other rabbinical writings indicating acceptance of the idea of Divine intervention in human affairs, with "God revealing his Will not alone to men but through men". He concludes that, even if the Documentary Hypothesis is partly (or even entirely) correct,
God's power is not lessened because He preferred to co-operate with His creatures in producing the Book of Books […] We hear the authentic voice of God speaking to us through the pages of the Bible […] and its message is in no way affected in that we can only hear that voice through the medium of human beings.

The "Jacobs Affair"
It had been widely assumed that after Epstein's retirement as principal of Jews' College he would be succeeded by Jacobs. When this assumption was translated into a definite invitation by the College's Board of Trustees in 1961, the then Chief Rabbi of the United Kingdom, Israel Brodie, interdicted the appointment "because of his [Jacobs's] published views". This was a reference to We Have Reason to Believe.

The British newspaper, The Jewish Chronicle, took up the issue and turned it into a cause célèbre which was reported in the national press, including The Times. It wasan event that threatened to become the biggest schism in Anglo-Jewish history.
The events in 1964 that came to be known as "the Jacobs Affair" dominated not just the Jewish media but the whole of Fleet Street and the newsrooms of both the BBC and ITN. Not that Jacobs himself was a willing participant in the affair. He was dragged into it by the religious establishment of the day. When Jacobs wished to return to his pulpit at the New West End Synagogue, Brodie vetoed his appointment. A number of members then left the New West End Synagogue to found the New London Synagogue.

Public interest in Dr. Jacobs's differences with the Anglo-Jewish establishment is also demonstrated by the television interview of Dr. Jacobs of 1966 conducted by Bernard Levin.

The New London Synagogue
The defecting congregation purchased the old St John's Wood synagogue building, and installed Jacobs as its rabbi – a post which he held until 2001 and to which he returned in 2005. This congregation, The New London Synagogue, became the "parent" of the Masorti movement in the United Kingdom, which now numbers several congregations.

While holding the position of rabbi at the New London Synagogue, Dr Jacobs was also for many years Lecturer in Talmud and Zohar at the Leo Baeck College, a rabbinical college preparing students to serve as Masorti, Reform and Liberal rabbis in the UK and Europe. Rabbi Jacobs served as Chairman of the Academic Committee for some years.

When the Masorti Movement in Britain was created its founders asked him to be its spiritual guide. Despite his ambivalence about the need and purpose of a new movement, he agreed. But he refused to be regarded as its founder. He always described Masorti as a 'mood not a movement'.

Since the founding of the New London Synagogue, Jacobs and the Masorti movement were subject to hostility from Orthodox British Jewish institutions. On his 83rd birthday, in the Bournemouth United Synagogue on the sabbath before his granddaughter's wedding, Jacobs was not provided the honour of an aliyah customarily given to the father of the bride, which gave rise to heated correspondence in the Jewish press including accusations of pettiness and vindictiveness. The Chief Rabbi, Sir Jonathan Sacks, and the head of the London Beth Din, Dayan Chanoch Ehrentreu, responded that, because of what they considered to be Jacobs's heretical beliefs, "they believed that had Jacobs uttered the words 'Our God […] who gave us the Torah of truth […] ', he would have made a false statement".

Witness for Chabad-Lubavitch
Jacobs testified on behalf of the Chabad Lubavitch movement during the Chabad library controversy. Being an acknowledged scholar on Chasidism, Jacobs was called as an expert witness to testify on the Chabad practice of "ma'amad" (support), the method by which the members of the Chabad community supported their Rebbe.

Jacobs testified that "[ma'mad] is a due, for which every member of the movement is expected to consider himself responsible, and ... there is an amount according to means which every member pays or is expected to pay. It is best compared to membership dues of a learned society or a sacred society, and the dues are expected as [a] token of membership." Jacobs noted that other Chasidic groups support their Rebbes by gifts known as "pidyon" (redemption) or "pidyon nefesh" (redemption of the soul) delivered personally to a rebbe. Pidyon is understood by Jacobs as "a personal gift, as it were ... for [spiritual] services rendered."

Death and legacy

Jacobs died on 1 July 2006 and is buried at Western Cemetery (Cheshunt)  alongside his wife Sophie (Shulamit) (1921–2005).

A few months before he died, Jacobs donated his book collection to the Leopold Muller Memorial Library at the Oxford Centre for Hebrew and Jewish Studies.

In December 2005, a poll by The Jewish Chronicle of its subscribers, in which 2,000 readers made their nominations, voted Jacobs the "greatest British Jew" in the community's 350-year history in England. Jacobs commented "I feel greatly honoured – and rather daft." Nevertheless, reports that Louis Jacobs had been nominated greatest British Jew received wide press coverage in Britain.

Selected publications
Jewish Prayer
We Have Reason to Believe (1957, revised editions in 1961 and 1965)
Jewish Values
Jewish Thought Today (Chain of Tradition Series, Vol. 3)
Studies in Talmudic Logic (and Methodology) (1961)
Principles of the Jewish Faith (An Analytic Study) (1964)
A Jewish Theology
Jewish Ethics, Philosophy and Mysticism
Tract on Ecstasy
Hasidic Prayer
The Jewish Mystics (1990)
The Book of Jewish Belief
Faith (1968)
What does Judaism say about ...? (The New York Times Library of Jewish Knowledge)
The Jewish Religion: A Companion (1995), Oxford University Press, 
Turn Aside from Evil and Do Good: An Introduction and a Way to the Tree of Life, (1995), Littman Library of Jewish Civilization, (c);  (p) (author Zevi Hirsch Eichenstein, translation by Louis Jacobs).

Louis Jacobs online
Websites with information about Jacobs's writings and thought:
We have reason to believe. 3rd edition, 1965
  Rabbi Louis Jacobs. Friends of Louis Jacobs website
  Reading Rabbi Jacobs project

Notes

Sources
Jacobs, Louis. Helping With Inquiries (autobiography) (1989) 
Jacobs, Louis. We have Reason to Believe  (3rd edition). Vallentine Mitchell: London (1965)
 Obituaries (see below)

Further reading
Freedman, Harry (2020). Reason to Believe: The Controversial Life of Louis Jacobs Bloomsbury Continuum: London (2020) 
 Cosgrove, Elliot J (2008). "Teyku: The Insoluble Contradictions in the Life and Thought of Louis Jacobs", vol 1, vol 2, PhD Thesis, University of Chicago.
 Apple, Raymond  (2008). "Kovno & Oxford: Israel Brodie & his rabbinical career"

External links
Obituary The Times, 4 July 2006
Obituary The Guardian, 5 July 2006
Obituary The Forward (New York), 7 July 2006
Obituary The Independent, 11 July 2006
Obituary The Daily Telegraph, 15 July 2006 
Obituaries and tributes, New London Synagogue

1920 births
2006 deaths
20th-century English rabbis
20th-century British theologians
20th-century British writers
Academics of the London School of Jewish Studies
Alumni of University College London
British Conservative rabbis
British Jewish theologians
Burials at Western Cemetery (Cheshunt)
Commanders of the Order of the British Empire
Judaism-related controversies
People associated with Leo Baeck College
Rabbis from Manchester